Bituin Escalante (born April 23, 1977) is a Filipina singer and actress. She is considered the Philippines' best female vocalists having been active since 2000, and notably due to the success of her Himig Handog entry "Kung Ako Na Lang Sana".

Career
Before her eventual rise through  Metropop and Himig Handog, Escalante has been active in the theatrical scene since 1996, and has appeared in some television shows.

Discovery
Bituin rose to popularity after her first appearance in the 2000 Metropop Song Festival with her interpretation of "Paano Na", written by Arnold Reyes where she received the festival's second prize. In the following year, Bituin won awards as a new artist in the Philippine music industry.

Her 2002 song, "Kung Ako Na Lang Sana" written by Soc Villanueva, is the 2002 ABS-CBN Himig Handog Music Love Song Festival grand prize winner. She was also awarded Best Interpreter for this song and was later on given a platinum award for said album. She is one of the singers in ASAP.

Discography

Theater

Awards
 2001 ALIW Awards: Most Promising Female Artist
 2001 Who's Who in the Philippines: Best Female Performer
 2002 ABS-CBN Himig Handog Love Song Competition: Best Interpreter (song "Kung Ako na Lang Sana")
 2003 Awit Awards: Song of the Year (Kung Ako Na Lang Sana
 2003 Awit Awards: Best Performance by a Female Artist
 2007 Awit Awards: Best Performance by a Duo or Group (with Mon David)

References

External links
 https://web.archive.org/web/20110721085515/http://www.pahk.com.hk/BITUIN%20write-up.htm

Living people
1977 births
Filipino women pop singers
Viva Records (Philippines) artists
21st-century Filipino singers
21st-century Filipino women singers